Ornithidium, is genus of orchids (family Orchidaceae). Its members are native to the West Indies and to Latin America from southern Mexico to Bolivia.

Ornithidium has often been included in the larger genus Maxillaria but recent molecular studies have found Maxillaria  as it has long been viewed to be an unnatural hodgepodge composed of groups not closely related to each. Hence it has been proposed that the genus should be split into several genera, proposals that have been gaining acceptance.

Selected species 
Ornithidium coccineum 
Ornithidium donaldeedodii

References 

Maxillarieae genera
Maxillariinae
Epiphytic orchids